Michael H. Schlossberg (born May 5, 1983) is a member of the Pennsylvania House of Representatives, representing the 132nd district since 2013. He is a member of the Democratic Party.

Personal life and education
Schlossberg graduated from Livingston High School in Livingston, New Jersey, in 2001. He graduated from Muhlenberg College in 2005, majoring in political science and psychology. Schlossberg earned a MA from Lehigh University in 2006.

Schlossberg is married to Brenna Schlossberg, a teacher in the Allentown School District.

Career
Schlossberg was elected to the Allentown City Council in 2009, becoming its youngest member ever. Schlossberg was elected to the Pennsylvania House in 2012. His predecessor retired and endorsed Schlossberg, and Schlossberg was the only candidate of any party to appear on the primary ballot. Schlossberg serves on the Rules committee

In 2013, Schlossberg introduced a bill that would require rapists to pay child support for the children they fathered.

References

External links

Living people
Politicians from Allentown, Pennsylvania
Jewish American state legislators in Pennsylvania
Muhlenberg College alumni
Lehigh University alumni
Pennsylvania city council members
Democratic Party members of the Pennsylvania House of Representatives
21st-century American politicians
1983 births
21st-century American Jews
Livingston High School (New Jersey) alumni
People from Livingston, New Jersey
Politicians from Essex County, New Jersey